The Ohaba is a right tributary of the river Strei in Romania. The river rises under mount Chicera Izvorului. It flows southwestwards and in the proximity of Mount Plopi it enters a sinkhole. The river emerges in cave Șura Mare, near the village of Ohaba-Ponor, being locally referred to as Lunca Ponorului. It joins the Strei near the village of Ponor.

References

Rivers of Romania
Rivers of Hunedoara County